The 1982 Davidson Wildcats football team represented Davidson College as a member of the Southern Conference during the 1982 NCAA Division I-AA football season. Led by ninth-year head coach Ed Farrell, the Wildcats compiled an overall record of 3–7.

Schedule

References

Davidson
Davidson Wildcats football seasons
Davidson Wildcats football